Delek Drilling LP is an Israeli energy Oil & Gas partnership in the exploration, development, and production of Natural Gas and Oil. Delek group owned by Yitzhak Tshuva, is the controlling shareholder of the partnership. The partnership is traded on the Tel Aviv Stock Exchange and is part of the TA 35 Index.

History 
Delek Drilling was founded by Avinoam Finkelman and served as the search department of the Delek group, then controlled by the IDB group. The partnership was founded with an agreement signed on July 1, 1993 between Delek Drilling Management (1993) Ltd as a general partner and Delek Drilling Trusts Ltd as a limited partner. The Partnerships holdings include Yam Tethys Ltd, Delek Drilling (Leviathan Finance) Ltd, Delek Drilling (Yam Tethys Finance) Ltd, Delek and Avner Yam Tethys Ltd and Delek Drilling (Tamar Finance) Ltd.

In 1998, Yitzhak Tshuva, a self-made multi-billionaire, purchased control of Delek group, from the Recanati family.

In December 2016 the general meeting of Delek Drilling and Avner gas and oil search (both units of conglomerate Delek Group) decided on the merge of the two. In May 2017 the Merging process was completed when Avner was immersed into Delek Drilling. This established the position of Delek Drilling as the leading search body in Israel.

The Participating units of the partnership are traded on the Tel Aviv Stock Exchange, and it is considered one of the ten largest bodies of trade in the Tel Aviv Stock exchange market.

In October 2017, Delek Drilling and the Russian Gazprom signed a Memorandum of Understanding on to jointly examine the possibilities of using natural gas as a fuel for vehicles and special equipment in Israel.

The Gas Framework 
In December 2015, the Israeli Government approved the Natural Gas Framework, which constitutes a comprehensive regulation. Main principles of the Framework was that Delek must sell all their rights in the small fields Tanin and Karish within a specified 14 month timeframe. Delek Group must sell all of its rights in the Tamar field and Noble Energy must sell at least 11% of its rights by December 2021.

In 2016, Karish and Tanin Gas reserves were sold to Energean Energean Oil & Gas. The deal followed the natural gas framework requiring Delek Drilling and Noble Energy to sell these two reservoirs, which contain 60 BCM of gas for $148 million.

In 2017, sale of 9.25% of the holdings of Delek Drilling in the Tamar reservoir to the Tamar Petroleum partnership was completed for $980 million.

Discoveries 
Delek Drilling, alongside its partners Avner and Noble Energy were the first to provide commercial quantities of natural gas to the Israeli market as it started flowing gas from the Mary-b field by the coast of Ashkelon in 2004.

The field which was discovered in the year 2000 allowed setting up primary infrastructure for producing electricity using natural gas in Israel.

In 2009, Delek Drilling and Avner, played a leading role in discovering the Tamar gas reservoir alongside its partners Noble Energy, Isramco and Dor. The discovered reservoir, 4.5 kilometers deep in a 1,700 meters deep waters, was the biggest deep waters discovery in 2009 worldwide. In 2010 the Leviathan gas field, twice the size of the Tamar gas field, was discovered by a partnership which included Delek Drilling, Avner, Ratio and Noble Energy.

In 2011 Delek Drilling, Avner and Noble Energy discovered the Afrodita gas field, deep inside the territorial waters of Cyprus. Delek Drilling took part in a few other significant revelations in the waters of Israel (reservoirs Tanin, Dolphin, Karish and Tamar).

Discoveries by chronological order 

 1999 – Noa reservoir, discovered in cooperation with the American drilling company Noble Energy.
 2000 – Mary-B reservoir which together with the Noa reservoir combines the Yam Tethys project.
 2009 – Dalit and Tamar reservoirs, discovered by Delek Drilling in cooperation with Avner, Noble Energy, Isramco and Dor, containing 306 BCM.
 2010 – Leviathan reservoir, discovered by Delek Drilling in cooperation with Noble Energy, Avner, Ratio, containing 608 BCM.
 2011 – Afrodita reservoir, discovered by Delek Drilling in cooperation with Avner and Noble Energy, on the coast of Cyprus.
 2012 – Tanin reservoir, discovered by Delek Drilling in cooperation with Avner and Noble Energy containing 35 BCM.
 2013 – Karish reservoir, discovered by Delek Drilling in cooperation with Avner and Noble Energy on the coast of Haifa, containing 70 BCM

Energean bought Karish and Tanin reservoirs from Delek Drilling and plans to invest about $1.8 billion in developing them.

Exporting Gas 
Jordanian firms Arab Potash and Jordan Bromine signed a deal in 2014 to import 2 billion cubic metres of gas from Israel's Tamar field over 15 years. the gas is technically being sold to the Jordanians by the American company, Noble Energy (on behalf of the Israeli partners), and not directly by the Tamar partners which include Delek Drilling, Noble energy and Isramco. The flow of natural gas began in January 2017, marking the country's first ever exports of natural gas.

After developing the different reservoirs, an agreement signed in September 2016 finalized the export of natural gas to the Jordanian electricity company NEPCO from the Leviathan gas field for a time period of 15 years and at a total amount of approximately 45 BCM.

A large scale agreement worth over $15 billion was signed in February 2018 and included gas transactions for 10 years for the amount of 64 BCM with the Egyptian company Dolphinos. The Egyptian president, Abdel Fatah al-Sissi, addressed the deal: "It Has a lot of advantages for us (Egyptians), and I want people to be reassured." In September 2018, Delek Drilling and Noble Energy have announced that together with Egyptian company EastMed, they are acquiring a 39% stake in the EMG Egypt-Israel gas pipeline in order to fulfil their deal with Egypt's Dolphinus.

See also 

 Energy in Israel
 Natural gas in Israel
 Energy Triangle
Leviathan gas field

References

External links 

 Delek Drilling LP on TASE

Companies listed on the Tel Aviv Stock Exchange
Oil and gas companies of Israel
Companies based in Herzliya
Energy companies established in 1993
Israeli companies established in 1993